Saint Curcodomus (died ca. 680) was a Benedictine abbot and saint.  He succeeded Saint Humbert at Maroilles Abbey.

References

External links
Curcodomus

French Benedictines
680 deaths
7th-century Frankish saints
Year of birth unknown